is a railway station located in the city of Tsuruoka, Yamagata, Japan, operated by the East Japan Railway Company (JR East).

Lines
Tsuruoka Station is served by the Uetsu Main Line, and is located  kilometers from the starting point of the line at Niitsu Station.

Station layout
The station has one side platform and one island platform connected to the station building by a footbridge.  The station has a Midori no Madoguchi staffed ticket office, a NewDays convenience store, and coin lockers.

Platforms

History
Tsuruoka Station opened on 21 September 1918. With the privatization of Japanese National Railways (JNR) on 1 April 1987, the station came under the control of JR East.

Passenger statistics
In fiscal 2018, the station was used by an average of 1203 passengers daily (boarding passengers only),

Surrounding area

MARICA
APA Hotel Yamagata Tsuruoka-Ekimae
Hotel Route-Inn Tsuruoka-Ekimae
Hotel Stay-in Sannō Plaza Annex
Tokyo Daiichi Hotel Tsuruoka

Tsuruoka Information Centre
Tsuruoka-Ekimae Shopping District
S-MALL
Shufu no Mise
Tsuruoka-Ekimae Post Office

See also
 List of railway stations in Japan

References

External links

 Tsuruoka Station information (JR East) 

Stations of East Japan Railway Company
Railway stations in Yamagata Prefecture
Uetsu Main Line
Railway stations in Japan opened in 1918
Tsuruoka, Yamagata